The 15K run (15 kilometers, or approximately 9.32 miles) is a long distance foot race. It is a rarely held race that is not recognized as an Olympic event. The overall world best time for men was set by Jacob Kiplimo en route the Lisbon Half Marathon. Excluding en route times both the world best for men and women were set at the Zevenheuvelenloop in Nijmegen, Netherlands. The world best for men is held by Joshua Cheptegei of Uganda who ran a time of 41:05. The women's world best is held by Letesenbet Gidey of Ethiopia who ran a time of 44:20.

Between 1985 and 1991, the IAAF World Women's Road Race Championships was contested over the 15 km distance.

All-time top 25
+ = en route to longer performance
Mx = mixed gender race
Wo = women only race

Men
Correct as of October 2022.

Notes
Below is a list of other times equal or superior to 41:29:
Jacob Kiplimo also ran 40:43 (2022), 41:11 (2020).
Rhonex Kipruto also ran 41:16 (2021).
Philemon Kiplimo also ran 41:16 (2021).
Kibiwott Kandie also ran 41:16 (2022).
Joshua Cheptegei also ran 41:17 (2017).
Leonard Komon also ran 41:26 (2011).
Rodgers Kwemoi also ran 41:27 (2021).
Alexander Mutiso also ran 41:27 (2022).

Women
Correct as of March 2023.

Notes
Below is a list of other times equal or superior to 46:15:
Letesenbet Gidey also ran 44:29 (2021).
Yalemzerf Yehualaw also ran 45:24  (2021), 45:27  (2022), 45:29  (2021).
Hellen Obiri also ran 45:39 (2023), 45:50 .
Sheila Chepkirui also ran 45:51 .
Joan Chelimo also ran 45:54 (2018), 46:09 (2018), 46:13 (2020).
Joyciline Jepkosgei also ran 45:57 (2017), 46:00 (2023).
Brigid Kosgei also ran 45:59  (2019) and 46:11  (2021).
Fancy Chemutai also ran 46:07 (2018).

Notes

References

 
Road running distances
Long-distance running distances